Elvin Astanov (born 5 July 1979) is an Azerbaijani Paralympic athlete. He made his maiden Paralympic appearance representing the Azerbaijan at the 2020 Summer Paralympics.

He clinched gold medal at the age of 42 in the men's F53 shot put event during the 2020 Summer Paralympics.

References 

1979 births
Living people
Paralympic gold medalists for Azerbaijan
Athletes (track and field) at the 2020 Summer Paralympics
Paralympic athletes of Azerbaijan
Paralympic medalists in athletics (track and field)
Medalists at the 2020 Summer Paralympics
Azerbaijani people of Armenian descent
Azerbaijani shot putters